The Imagery Alliance is a collection of visual arts organizations created to improve orphan works legislation.

Members
Advertising Photographers of America (APA)
American Institute of Graphic Arts (AIGA)
American Society of Media Photographers (ASMP)
American Society of Picture Professionals (ASPP)
Association of Photographers (AOP) (UK)
The Association of Photographers
Art Directors Club (ADC)
British Association of Picture Libraries and Agencies (BAPLA)
Coordination of European Agencies Press Stock Heritage (CEPIC)
Editorial Photographers (EP)
The Graphic Artists Guild (GAG)
Illustrators' Partnership of America (IPA)
North American Nature Photography Association (NANPA)
National Press Photographers Association (NPPA)
Picture Archive Council of America (PACA)
Picture Licensing Universal System (PLUS)
Professional Photographers of America (PPA)
Society for Photographic Education (SPE)
Stock Artists Alliance (SAA)
White House News Photographers Association (WHNPA)

See also
Copyright Alliance
Digital Freedom campaign

External links
https://web.archive.org/web/20070710201952/http://www.illustratorspartnership.org/01_topics/article.php?searchterm=00246

Arts organizations based in the United States